The Virgin Prophetess, or The Fate of Troy is a 1701 tragedy by Elkanah Settle featuring music by Gottfried Finger. It is a semi-opera with masque-like elements breaking up the scenes.

The original cast included John Mills as Menelaus, Philip Griffin as Ulysses, Thomas Simpson as Neoptolemus, Robert Wilks as Paris, Anne Oldfield as Helen and Jane Rogers as Cassandra.

References

Bibliography
 Burling, William J. A Checklist of New Plays and Entertainments on the London Stage, 1700-1737. Fairleigh Dickinson Univ Press, 1992.

1701 plays
West End plays
Tragedy plays
Plays by Elkanah Settle